Hilário Rosário da Conceição, OM (born 19 March 1939), known as Hilário, is a Portuguese former footballer who played as a left-back.

He spent his entire professional career with Sporting CP, appearing in nearly 450 competitive matches and winning seven major trophies.

An international for 12 years, Hilário represented Portugal at the 1966 FIFA World Cup.

Club career
Born in Lourenço Marques, Portuguese Mozambique, Hilário was first noticed at Sporting de Lourenço Marques as Eusébio, but the former signed for Sporting CP as the latter joined city rivals S.L. Benfica. He put his youth career on hold for nearly two years and switched to basketball, as he often played football barefoot due to the fact he did not feel comfortable wearing cleats.

Hilário was an undisputed starter for 14 of the following 15 Primeira Divisão seasons, winning three national championships and as many Taça de Portugal. He missed the club's conquest of the 1963–64 European Cup Winners' Cup, due to a serious tibia injury contracted against Vitória de Setúbal just three days before the final against MTK Budapest FC.

After ending his playing days, Hilário immediately embarked in a managerial career. This included his only spells in the Portuguese top division, with S.C. Braga in the 1976–77 and the 1979–80 seasons, and assistant stints with Sporting (both first and reserve teams).

International career
Hilário made his debut for the Portugal national team on 11 November 1959, in a 5–3 friendly loss to France. He went on earn a further 39 caps, his last appearance coming on 17 February 1971 in a 3–0 defeat against Belgium in UEFA Euro 1972 qualifying.

Hilário was called up for the 1966 FIFA World Cup by manager Otto Glória, featuring in all the matches for the third-placed side.

Honours
Sporting CP
Primeira Divisão: 1961–62, 1965–66, 1969–70
Taça de Portugal: 1962–63, 1970–71, 1972–73
European Cup Winners' Cup: 1963–64

Portugal
FIFA World Cup third place: 1966

References

External links

1939 births
Living people
Mozambican emigrants to Portugal
Sportspeople from Maputo
Mozambican footballers
Portuguese footballers
Association football defenders
Primeira Liga players
Sporting CP footballers
Portugal international footballers
1966 FIFA World Cup players
Portuguese football managers
Primeira Liga managers
S.C. Braga managers
C.S. Marítimo managers
Leixões S.C. managers
S.C. Covilhã managers
Académico de Viseu F.C. managers
S.C. Lusitânia managers
Expatriate football managers in Mozambique